Kami are beings venerated in the Japanese Shinto tradition.

Kami may also refer to:
 Kami (official) (Japanese: 守), the highest rank of Kokushi officials
 Origami paper

People
 Kami (caste), a social caste in Nepal
 Kami (given name)
 Kami (surname)
 Kami people, a people in Tanzania
 Kami (musician), a Japanese drummer, a member of Malice Mizer
 Kami (rapper), an American rapper, a member of Leather Corduroys
Y.Z. Kami, Iranian-American artist

Places

Iran
 Kami, East Azerbaijan, a village in East Azerbaijan Province
 Kami, South Khorasan, a village in South Khorasan Province
 Kami, Razavi Khorasan, a village in Razavi Khorasan Province

Japan
 Kami, Hyōgo (Taka), now part of Taka, Hyōgo
 Kami, Hyōgo (Mikata), part of Mikata District, Hyōgo
 Kami, Kōchi
 Kami, Miyagi
 Kami, Nagano

Other
 Khami, or Kami, an ancient city of Zimbabwe
 Rasu Kami, a village in India

Entertainment
 Kami (1982 film), a 1982 Malaysian film
 Kami (2008 film), a 2008 Malay film based on the TV series of the same name
 Kami, a character in the manga and anime series of Dragon Ball
 Kami-sama or The Almighty, a character in the manga and anime Oh My Goddess!
 Kami (Sesame Africa), a character on children's television show Takalani Sesame and Sesame Square
 Kami (Magic the Gathering), characters in the Magic: The Gathering block Kamigawa

Other uses
 KAMI (AM), a radio station in Nebraska, United States
 KAMI (Indonesia), Kesatuan Aksi Mahasiswa Indonesia ("Indonesian Students Action Forum"), an Indonesian anti-communist group formed in 1965

See also
 Kami-sama (disambiguation)